HaKokhav HaBa (translated as "The Next Star"; formerly HaKokhav HaBa LaErovizion, Rising Star to the Eurovision) is an Israeli interactive reality singing competition, which was first broadcast on Channel 2 from 17 September 2013. It is based on the Rising Star franchise created by Keshet Broadcasting. The show is a continuation of the former program Kokhav Nolad (meaning "A Star is Born") which featured aspiring singers competing for a winning title. The program's format combines the internet, smartphones and television and is filmed live.

The shows inaugurative season in 2013 was won by Evyatar Korkus. Since season 2 until season 7, the winner was given the opportunity to represent Israel in the Eurovision Song Contest. 2014–2015 winner Nadav Guedj represented Israel in 2015 with "Golden Boy" 2015–2016 winner Hovi Star represented Israel in 2016 with "Made of Stars", 2016–2017 winner Imri Ziv represented Israel in 2017 with "I Feel Alive", and 2017–2018 winner Netta Barzilai who went on to win the 2018 contest with "Toy". Kobi Marimi won in 2019 and represented Israel on home soil in Tel Aviv. Eden Alene won in 2020, and was due to represent Israel with the song Feker Libi, however the contest was cancelled due to the COVID-19 pandemic. Alene was re-announced as the Israeli representative for the upcoming 2021 contest a few days after its cancellation.
Starting from season 8, the prize for the winner of the show will no longer be representing Israel in the Eurovision Song Contest (The X Factor Israel received that honor instead), but instead, the prize will be money for helping for the winner developing his career, just like it used to be in season 1.

Format
As the season begins, each contestant is asked to perform a well-known song in front of judges. After the song, a vote is taken among judges whether to transfer the applicant to the test stage facing the audience at home. If the judges are not sure about how to vote, the contestant is required to perform another song, and then a decision is made.

Contestants who do move forward must then sing in front of an audience. Viewers then connect with an app at makoTV and decide in real time whether a contestant passes or does not pass.

Judges also influence the test stage - all judges may support the promotion of the contestant and thereby add 8% percent if there are five judges or 10% if there are four. Once the contestant reaches 70% of votes they "pass" and the screen opens and the contestant goes to the next level. 14 singers then move on to a section where the judges and the audience at home vote. At the final stage, four singers are left and one will be elected "The Next Star".

Seasons overview

Season 1 (2013)

This season host is Assi Azar and the co-host is Esti Ginzburg. The judges are Rita, Zvika Hadar, Muki and Rani Rahav. Eyal Golan judged the program until his suspension on 20 November 2013, and after four days was replaced by Muki.

Participants
In order:

George Abu Shakra – 14th Place
Dondit Jon – 13th Place
Alon Tube – 12th Place
Roni Israeli – 11th Place
Lior Peretz – 10th Place
Hen Levy – 9th Place
Inbal Bekman – 8th Place
Elias Melayev – 7th Place (Quit)
David Drey – 6th Place
Omer Datz – 5th Place

Finalists
Rinat Cohen – Fourth place
Tina Ibagrimov – Third place
Arye & Gil Gat  – Second place
Evyatar Korkus – Winner

Season 2 (2014–15)

The winner of season two would represent Israel in the Eurovision Song Contest 2015.

Participants
In order:

Evyatar Adir  – 16th Place
Zadok Garamech – 15th Place
Almog Nasawi – 14th Place
Random Dogs – 13th Place
David Maman – 12th Place
Eva Al Kanrash – 11th Place
Asif Zilberman – 10th Place
Liroz Balas – 9th Place
Yifi and Osher Aricha – 8th Place
Nava Tehila Walker – 7th Place
Saar "Rusty" Davidov – 6th Place
Orit Biansey – 5th Place

Finalists
Avia Shoshani – Fourth place
Sary Nachmias – Third place
Iky Levy and the Rasta Hebrew Men  –Second place
Nadav Guedj – Winner

Season 3 (2015–16)

This season was named "The Next Star to the Eurovision"
The winner of season three would represent Israel in the Eurovision Song Contest 2016.

Participants
In order:

Alma Kalbermann - 16th Place
Maya Bernadski - 15th Place
Sharon Fartouk - 14th Place
Yoni Grayev - 13th Place
Avi Eliot Alush and Sister Shvakya - 12th Place
Neomi Ezran - 11th Place
Uriel Aharoni - 10th Place
Shtar - 9th Place
Ofir Haim - 8th Place
Oded Sharavi - 7th Place
"Velma" - 6th Place
Kiara Duple (Lior Cohen) - 5th Place

Finalists
Gil Hadash – Fourth place
Ella Daniel - Third place
Nofar Salman - Second place
Hovi Star - Winner

Season 4 (2017)

The winner of season four would represent Israel in the Eurovision Song Contest 2017. The show is hosted by Yael Goldman joined by Assi Azar and Rotem Sela. The presiding judges are Keren Peles and Harel Skaat who were judges in the previous two seasons joined by new judges Assaf Amdursky and the duo Static and Ben El Tavori.

Participants
In order:

Yona Shabin - 8th Place
Hally Lewis - 7th Place
Ta-La-Te - 6th Place
Sapir Nahon - 5th Place

Finalists
Beatbox Element - Fourth Place
Julieta - Third place
Diana Golbi - Second place
Imri - Winner

Season 5 (2017–18)

Israel participated in the Eurovision Song Contest 2018 as the Israeli broadcaster Israeli Public Broadcasting Corporation (IPBC) for the first time collaborated with the commercial broadcaster Keshet and Tedy Productions which organized the reality singing competition HaKokhav HaBa L'Eurovizion ("The Next Star for Eurovision") to select the singer to represent Israel, while the song was chosen by a committee of the Israeli broadcaster. Four contestants reached the final, Chen Aharoni, Jonathan Mergui, Riki Ben Ari and Netta Barzilai. The season was won by Netta Barzilai, the first woman to win the series. As a result, she represented Israel at Eurovision Song Contest 2018. She went on to win the contest in Lisbon with the song "Toy" earning 529 points.

Participants
In order:

Axum - 20th Place
Tal Mizrahi - 19th Place
Ofir Harush - 18th Place
Shir Baruch - 17th Place
The Choice - 16th Place
Shir Gadasi - 15th Place
Jaki Gaforov - 14th Place
Gal Yaakobi - 13th Place
Rinat Bar (Quit) - 12th Place
Sarit Hativa - 11th Place
Shay & Gilad - 10th Place
José Steinberg  - 9th Place
Adava Omer - 8th Place
Ravit Batashvili - 7th Place
Howie Danao - 6th Place
Eden Meiri - 5th Place

Finalists
Chen Aharoni – Fourth place
Riki Ben Ari - Third place
Mergui - Second place
Netta - Winner

Season 6 (2018–19)

Kobi Marimi won the show with 383 points, beating runner up Keteryah and third place Shefita. Kobi represented Israel at Eurovision Song Contest 2019 with his song "Home".

Participants
In order:

Wanna Wanna - 20th Place
Shachaf - 19th Place
Lior Chen - 18th Place
Naama Gali Cohen - 17th Place
Liat Eliyahu - 16th Place
Nitay Twito - 15th Place
Nave Madmon - 14th Place
Naor Cohen - 13th Place
Klara Sabag - 12th Place
Osher Biton - 11th Place
Danielle Mazuz - 10th Place
Tai - 9th Place
Ofri Calfon - 8th Place
Daniel Barzilai - 7th Place
Avraham de Carvalho - 6th Place

Finalists
Shalva Band – Fifth place (Quit)
Maya Bouskilla – Fourth place
Shefita - Third place
Ketreyah - Second place
Kobi Marimi - Winner

Season 7 (2019–20)

This season was announced by the IPBC to be the last season as the method of choosing the artist for Eurovision. Eden Alene emerged as the winner, however, the Eurovision contest for this year was cancelled due to the COVID-19 pandemic, and Alene was re-selected to compete in the Eurovision Song Contest 2021 instead.

Participants
In order:

Or Eddie - 20th Place
Nathan Katorza - 19th Place
Dana Lapidot - 18th Place
Oneg Israel - 17th Place
HaTavlinim - 16th Place
Linoy Akala and Gil Shapira - 15th Place
Nicki Goldstein - 14th Place
Avihu Pinhasov Rhythm Club - 13th Place
Omer Eliyahu - 12th Place
Dorel Saadon - 11th Place
Eden Zohar Sivan - 10th Place
Loai Ali - 9th Place
Ohad Shragai - 8th Place
Lali Kolishkin - 7th Place
Moran Aharoni - 6th Place
Raviv Kaner - 5th Place

Finalists
Gaya Shaki - Fourth place
Orr Amrami Brockman - Third place
Ella Lee - Second place
Eden Alene - Winner

Season 8 (2021)

Starting from this season, the show is no longer used to select the Israeli representative for the Eurovision Song Contest (The X Factor Israel received this honor instead). Instead, the grand prize for the winner is one million shekels for starting his career, a similar prize of season 1.
The cast of hosts and judges remained the same as the previous season, with Ninet Tayeb joining the judges as well.

Participants
In order:

Shalev Edri - 22nd Place
Matan Agami - 21st Place
Naor Ormia - 20th Place
Niv Shaked - 19th Place
Ofri Tal - 18th Place
Ella Lavie - 17th Place
Orit Shalom - 16th Place
David Meir Ziton - 15th Place
Yotal Guez - 14th Place
Noa Yosefian - 13th Place
Mira Semenduev - 12th Place 
Adar Kagan - 11th Place 
Maayan Bukris - 10th Place 
Lia Shaked - 9th Place
Tamar Azran - 8th Place
Dorin Hirvy - 7th Place
Sahar Twito - 6th Place
Anael Moshe - 5th Place

Finalists
Shay Hamber - Fourth place
Matan Levi - Third place
Valerie Hamaty - Second place
Tamir Grinberg - Winner

Season 9 (2022)

In February 17, 2022, Static & Ben El Tavori retired from the show and Ran Danker replaced them. Season 9 began on July 18, 2022.

Participants
In order:

Eilon Shaltiel - 18th Place
Shiri Oren - 17th Place
Nevo Alon - 15th/16th Place
Michael Levi - 15th/16th Place
Shalom Sabag - 14th Place
Kfir Tsafrir - 13th Place
Talia Sol Azarzar - 12th Place
Zohar Yaacobi - 11th Place
Yam Gronich - 10th Place
Omer Yefet - 9th Place
Karmi Glasner - 8th Place
Yahalom David - 7th Place
Niv Demirel - 6th Place
Yanai Ben Hamo - 5th Place

Finalists
Libi Panker - Fourth Place
Meitav Sherman - Third Place
Nofia Yedidia - Second Place
Eliav Zohar - Winner

Eurovision performance

International versions

After the success of the Israeli series in 2013, many television stations throughout the world bought the rights and started broadcasting similar series.

The American television network ABC began airing its first series of Rising Star in June 2014 from Los Angeles. The US edition was also carried in Canada, with advertising simultaneous substitution and voting access on CTV. The show was canceled after its full 10-episode season due to low ratings in its target demographic, and extremely low ratings on the German and French versions.

Another major broadcaster RTL Television launched a German language version in Germany. But following reported poor ratings on its early shows, it announced it was bringing Rising Star Germany scheduled final forward airing an extended one-day finale between 20.15 and 00.00 to decide the winning performer, rather than completing the full 10-episode scheduled season originally planned.

The UK ITV channel bought the rights, but canceled its scheduled launch citing lower-than-expected viewership in similar launches in the United States and Germany. Canale 5 also bought the rights to an Italian version of the show, which was also canceled during development for unexplained reasons.

French television M6, with its first season, launched in September 2014 keeping the title Rising Star. The French version had a shortened season due to low ratings. The Italian television Canale 5 launched its version as Rising Star.

Other broadcasters that adapted the series include Argentine Telefe as Elegidos (La música en tus manos), Brazilian Rede Globo as SuperStar, Chinese CCTV-3, Greek ANT1 , Hungarian TV2 as Rising Star, Indonesian RCTI as Rising Star Indonesia  (later, MNCTV as sister channel of RCTI make dangdut version of this show entitled Rising Star Indonesia Dangdut), Portuguese Televisão Independente (TVI) as Rising Star: A próxima estrela, Russia-1 as Артист (Artist), and Turkish TV8 as Yükselen Yıldız. The Russian version of the show had a shortened season due to low ratings on the French and German versions, while the Portuguese and Brazilian versions became quickly popular, but neither lasted more than three seasons; the Brazilian version ended in 2016 after three seasons due to declining viewership. The Indonesian version is the longest-running version of the show outside of Israel.

See also
Kokhav Nolad
Israel in the Eurovision Song Contest 2015
Israel in the Eurovision Song Contest 2016
Israel in the Eurovision Song Contest 2017
Israel in the Eurovision Song Contest 2018
Israel in the Eurovision Song Contest 2019
Israel in the Eurovision Song Contest 2020

References

External links
Official website 

Rising Star (franchise)
2013 Israeli television seasons
2013 Israeli television series debuts
Channel 2 (Israeli TV channel) original programming
Israeli reality television series
Talent shows
Kokhav Nolad
Music competitions in Israel
Eurovision Song Contest selection events
Channel 12 (Israel) original programming